Nine men's and five women's rowing events took place at the 1999 Pan American Games in Canada. The gold medals were won by rowers from the United States, Canada and Argentina.


Men's events

Women's events

Medal table

References

Events at the 1999 Pan American Games
1999
1999 in rowing
Rowing competitions in Canada